Mananthavady Road is an agricultural suburb of Mysore district in the Indian state of Karnataka.

Terminology
The term Mananthavady Road is used for the 52 km stretch of road between Mysore and Heggadadevanakote (H.D.Kote) town in Karnataka. Some people use the term for the entire stretch up to Mananthavady town in Kerala province. The second stretch of the road passes through Nagarhole National Park. The second stretch is another 70 km long.

Populated Places

Important Towns on the Mananthavady Route
 Srirampur
 Handpost
 H.D.Kote
 Jayapura

Villages on the Mananthavady Route
 N.H.Palaya
 Kalavadi
 Kenchalagudu
 Kaliyugamane
 D.Salundi
 Doddundi
 D.B.Kuppe
 Machur
 Balle Elephant Camp
 Karapura
 Nisana Belathur
 Hemmankette
 Dommanakatete
 Anthare santhe
 Lakshmi pura
 Mahadeva Nagara
 Harohalli

Landmarks and Organizations
 Kaliyuva Mane School
 Railway workshop
 Prakruthi apartment
 Nirmala highschool
 Poorna chethana school
 Queen Mary hospital
 Good Shepherd School
 Mount Litera Zee School
 StJosephs Prasada Public School
 Mysore Public School
 Sericuluture Institute
 National Institute of Engineering

Image gallery

See also
 Ashokapuram, Mysore
 Jayaprakash Nagar Mysore
 H.D.Kote
 Nagarhole

References

Mysore South
Suburbs of Mysore